The Second Barbra Streisand Album is the title of Barbra Streisand's second solo studio album. It was released in August 1963, just six months after the release of her debut album, The Barbra Streisand Album, and was recorded in four days in June 1963.

In 1963, Streisand told a reporter: "My new album is called The Second Barbra Streisand Album, because that's just what it is. Why should I give it some fancy name that no one remembers anyway?"

Radio stations received mono and stereo blue vinyl promo albums, making this Columbia's first Streisand colored vinyl.

By 1966 the album sold over one million copies worldwide. The album made its digital debut on CD in 1987 and was re-released in a remastered CD edition on October 19, 1993.

Song information
"Any Place I Hang My Hat Is Home" was first introduced in the musical St. Louis Woman.
"Right as the Rain" was originally performed by Celeste Holm and David Brooks in the 1944 musical Bloomer Girl. Tony Bennett also recorded a version of the song in 1960 for his album A String of Harold Arlen.
"Down with Love" was previously recorded in 1940 by Eddie Condon's Orchestra with vocals by Lee Wiley.
"Who Will Buy?" is originally from the musical Oliver! (1960).
"When the Sun Comes Out" was originally performed by Tommy Dorsey in 1941.
"Gotta Move" was written specifically for Streisand by composer Peter Matz. It was later re-recorded for the TV special Color Me Barbra and its soundtrack album.
"Lover, Come Back to Me" was introduced in the operetta The New Moon (1928) by Evelyn Herbert.
"Like a Straw in the Wind" is performed as a medley with "Any Place I Hang My Hat Is Home".

Unreleased songs
 On 8 February 1963, Barbra recorded Cole Porter's “Who Would Have Dreamed” from the 1940 Broadway show Panama Hattie. The recording is still unreleased.
 A recording of "It Had to Be You" from June 1963 – the song was later re-recorded in November for The Third Album – the June recording is still unreleased.

Track listing

Non-album tracks
"When the Sun Comes Out" (1962 version)
"My Coloring Book" (1962 version)
"Lover, Come Back to Me" (1962 version)

Personnel
Barbra Streisand - vocals
Mike Berniker - producer
Peter Matz - arrangements, conductor
Peter Daniels - additional material 
Fred Plaut, Frank Laico - recording engineer
Fred Glaser - Ms. Streisand's coiffure
John Berg - album cover, design
Wood Kuzoumi - cover photography
Jule Styne - liner notes

Charts

Weekly charts

Year-end charts

Certifications and sales

External links
The Second Barbra Streisand Album - Barbra Archives

References

Barbra Streisand albums
1963 albums
Albums conducted by Peter Matz
Albums arranged by Peter Matz
Albums produced by Mike Berniker
Columbia Records albums